Tal Banat (also written Tel Benat, ; , also known in Arabic as al-Waleed) is a village located in the Sinjar District of the Ninawa Governorate in Iraq. The village is located south of the Sinjar Mount. It belongs to the disputed territories of Northern Iraq.

Tal Banat has a mainly Yazidi population. There are also about 1,400 Shia Turkmens in the village.

In August 2014, the Islamic State of Iraq and the Levant abducted more than 200 women and children from Tal Banat.

See also
 Yazidis in Iraq

References

Populated places in Nineveh Governorate
Yazidi populated places in Iraq
Turkmen communities in Iraq